Secretagogin is a protein that in humans is encoded by the SCGN gene.

Function 

The encoded protein is a secreted calcium-binding protein which is found in the cytoplasm. It is related to calbindin D-28K and calretinin. This protein is thought to be involved in potassium chloride-stimulated calcium flux and cell proliferation. This protein plays an important role in the release of the stress hormone Corticotropin-releasing hormone (CRH) and which only then enables stress processes in the brain.

References

Further reading

 

EF-hand-containing proteins